John Francis Cunningham may refer to:

 John Francis Cunningham (bishop) (1842–1919), Irish-born prelate of the Roman Catholic Church
 John Francis Cunningham (surgeon) (1875–1932), British ophthalmic surgeon

See also 
 John Cunningham (disambiguation)